Yaḥyā ibn Maʻīn (774-847), was a great classical Islamic scholar in the field of hadith of Persian origin. He was a close friend of Imam Ahmad ibn Hanbal. Ibn Ma'in is known to have spent all of his inheritance on seeking ḥadīths to the extent he became extremely needy.

Biography

Professional life 
He was born in 158 (A.D.) in the caliphate of Abu Jaafar, originally from the Nabataeans of Iraq from Anbar and brought up in Baghdad. He is the oldest of the great group, which are Ali bin Al-Madini, Ahmed bin Hanbal, Ishaq bin Rahwayh, Abu Bakr bin Abi Shaybah, and Abu Khaithama; they used to behave with him, and they recognized for him. It was an imam kept senior imams of his time, and was a close friend of a number of senior Imams such as Imam Ahmed bin Hanbal. Imam Council was required by Ahmad and his neighbor, and schooled in his hands until nhl of his knowledge, as it was Zahida and Ora honest confidence versed in the science of menMany were asking him to be one of his disciples. He was a close friend of Ahmad ibn Hanbal and is often quoted regarding Ilm ar-Rijal. Alongside Ibn Hanbal, Ali ibn al-Madini and Ibn Abi Shaybah, Ibn Ma'in has been considered by many Muslim specialists in hadith to be one of the four most significant authors in the field.

Academic career 
Yahya sought knowledge by means of various journeys which he made so rigorously that after the passing of his father, he spent all of his 1,050,000 inherited dirhams on seeking ḥadīth to the extent that nothing remained - not even enough purchase a pair of shoes. His journey of seeking knowledge of hadith and Islamic rulings caused him to travel to Basrah, Bagdād, Harān, Dimasq, al-Rasāfah, al-Ray, Sanʿā’, Kufā, Egypt and Mecca His works were not limited to mere approbations and disapprobation of narrators albeit being a master of his science, or narrating of aḥādīth; rather, he progressed forward as an author writing many books, although many are no longer extant, despite his formally writing as an author from the age of twenty. Of the books available today are; Ma’rifatul al-Rijāl, Yaḥyā bin Maʿīn wa Kitābuhu ‘l-Tārīkh and a small treatise titled ‘Min Kalām Abī Zakariyyā Yaḥyā bin Maʿīn fi ‘l-Rijāl’.

His teachers included Abdullah Ibn al-Mubārak, Ismāʿīl ibn ʿIyāsh, ‘Abād ibn ‘Abād, Sufyān ibn ʿUyainah, Gundur, Abū Muʿāwiyyah, Ḥātim ibn Ismāʿīl, Ḥafṣ ibn Giyāth, Jarīr ibn ʿAbdul-Ḥamīd, ‘Abd ur-Ruzzāq Sanani, Wakī’ and many others from Irāq, Ḥijāz, Jazīrah, Shām and Miṣr.

His famous students included Aḥmad bin Ḥanbal, Muḥammad bin Sʿad, Abū Khaithamah, al-Bukhārī, Muslim, Abū Dāwūd, ʿAbbās al-Dawrī, Abū Ḥātim and many more.

References

External links 

770s births
850s deaths
People from Baghdad
Persian Sunni Muslim scholars of Islam
Hanafis
Atharis
9th-century Muslim scholars of Islam
9th-century jurists
8th-century Iranian people
9th-century Iranian people
Biographical evaluation scholars